Olivera Đurđević (1928 in Belgrade – 2006) was a Serbian pianist, cembalist and professor at the Faculty of Music in Belgrade.

References

External links
Faculty of Music in Belgrade
Seecult
Academic Dejan Despić about Olivera Djurdjević
[www.danas.co.yu/20061230/dezurna1.html Danas]
History of the Faculty of Music in Belgrade

1928 births
2006 deaths
Musicians from Belgrade
Academic staff of the University of Arts in Belgrade
University of Arts in Belgrade alumni
Serbian classical pianists
Serbian harpsichordists
20th-century classical musicians
20th-century classical pianists